Chlorocoma dichloraria, the double-fringed emerald or Guenée's emerald, is a species of moth of the family Geometridae first described by Achille Guenée in 1858. It is found in the Australian states of New South Wales, Queensland, South Australia, Tasmania, Victoria and Western Australia.

The wingspan is about 30 mm.

The larvae feed on various Mimosaceae species.

External links

Geometrinae